Sa Riera, Catalonia, Spain is a fishing village and holiday resort situated in a tranquil and secluded bay of the Costa Brava close to the nearby inland towns of Palafrugell and Begur. It can be reached by road from Begur and Pals and there is also a pleasant walk around the cliffs from Platja de Pals, the next resort along the coast.

Sa Riera is typical of the many small coves set amongst rugged pine covered cliffs cascading down to meet the crystal clear waters of the Mediterranean Sea which have made the area north of Palamos and south of L'Estartit famous for its outstanding beauty. Originally a small fishing village, Sa Riera has not been overdeveloped and has retained its individuality and charm. 

Sa Riera has a beach that is sheltered and particularly popular in the summer months. 
There is also good snorkelling around the craggy rocks. There are  some small hotels and good seafood restaurants, small cafes & bars.  

Fishing communities
Populated places in Baix Empordà